Dead Mine is a 2012 English-language Indonesian horror film directed by Steven Sheil and starring Ario Bayu and Joe Taslim. The film was produced by Infinite Frameworks, the production house before working on the musical animated film Meraih Mimpi (Achieved a dream) in 2009. Filming and production of the film was done in the filming facility integrated in Batam Island.

Plot

The film opens with a group of pirates resting and relaxing after a successful raid. One of the pirates wanders off to relieve himself and stumbles upon a cave. While exploring it, he suddenly falls through a concealed hole in the floor into a hidden tunnel network.

Warren Price (Les Loveday), the son of a millionaire, is on a mission to explore a former Japanese military bunker on the island of Una-Una, Gulf of Tomini, Sulawesi, together with Japanese scientist Rie (Miki Mizuno), and Price's girlfriend Su-Ling (Carmen Soo). They are escorted by a team of mercenaries, including Captain Tino Prawa (Ario Bayu), Djoko (Joe Taslim), Ario (Mike Lewis), and Sergeant Papa Snake (Jaitov Tigor). Also along on the mission is Stanley (Sam Hazeldine), a former military engineer turned mercenary attached to Captain Prawa’s unit.

The team arrives at the site of a formerly Dutch operated mine, which had been taken over by the Japanese when they occupied the island in 1942, and turned into a bunker. After being ambushed by pirates, the group are forced inside the bunker where they become trapped after one of the pirates tosses a grenade into the mine entrance, wounding Ario and causing a collapse.

Unable to radio for help, and desperate to escape, they descend into the mine in search of a way out. It is revealed that Price actually wants to search for Yamashita's gold in the mine. Another expedition led by his father’s company had discovered a similar bunker on an island near Sumatra discussing coded messages; Price, working with Rie, had been trying to decode those messages, which he assumed referred to Yamashita’s gold.

As they progress deeper into the mine, lights suddenly flash on (revealing a Rising Sun Japanese war flag) and a propaganda song begins blaring over the internal communication system, startling the explorers. The group assumes that there’s a second entrance and the pirates have followed them into the mine. They continue exploring the seemingly abandoned Japanese base, discovering protective Hazmat suits, maps, and disturbing photographs. Sergeant Papa Snake, standing guard outside the communications center, is spied upon by a mysterious figure wearing a Hazmat suit and gas mask; however, when he turns, the figure has vanished without a trace.

Their search leads to some surprising findings; Rie reveals that the bunker was used as a chemical and biological weapons research facility (based on Unit 731) where the Japanese used prisoners of war as subjects for experiments. The group is stalked by the hazmat suit wearing figures as they progress through the mine. The group breaks up into two separate units; Captain Prawa, Sergeant Papa Snake, Price, and Su-Ling go to search for a way out(and, of course, the gold in the process) while Djoko, Stanley and Rie remain behind to protect Ario.

Ario, resting on a pallet bench, is attacked and killed by a monstrous creature, and pulled into the tunnels in the process. Djoko, Stanley and Rie frantically pursue it. Meanwhile, Captain Prawa’s team discovers medical notes detailing the sort of experiments the Japanese conducted at the bunker. Djoko discovers a chamber filled with human remains, including the horrifically mutilated corpse of the pirate from the beginning of the film. He kills one of the creatures, only for numerous others to emerge from the surrounding chamber. After losing his rifle to one attack, Djoko narrowly manages to fight off a second one, only for his pistol to jam; surrounded, he is promptly slaughtered by the creatures.

Rie and Stanley, meanwhile, are captured by the gas mask wearing figure, a Japanese soldier who refuses to admit the war is over. Stanley manages to disarm the soldier and Rie shows him footage of the Japanese surrender on the USS Missouri on her iPad, causing the soldier to break down. Captain Prawa’s group is attacked by one of the creatures, which stabs Price, being shot several times in the process without effect, before Sergeant Papa Snake kills it with an improvised spear. The Japanese soldier reveals that a type of gas Unit 731 was experimenting with had driven the prisoners insane and mutated them into monstrous creatures, and he and his fellow soldiers had likewise been mutated as part of an experiment to create “super soldiers”.

Price discovers that the gold had been sent to the base in order to be used as part of the mutagenic formulas they’d injected the prisoners with, and desperate to avoid leaving with nothing he and Su-Ling try and sneak a sample out as the formulas can be sold for huge money as biological weapons in the black market. Captain Prawa and Sergeant Papa Snake discover a shrine filled with dozens of creatures dressed in samurai suits of armor—soldiers from the Japanese Imperial Guard given the same mutagenic compound. Sergeant Papa Snake stays behind and tries to hold the Imperial Guardsmen off, being stabbed repeatedly and finally killed as a result. Captain Prawa, Price, and Su-Ling continue to flee, eventually stumbling upon the chamber in which Djoko was killed. They discover Djoko’s corpse and then are attacked by the creatures, and are forced to use improvised knives to fight them off. Fleeing again through the tunnels they are finally reunited with Stanley and Rei. Price is badly wounded, and desperate to try to save him Su-Ling injects him with the formula they’d taken from the lab. The Imperial Guardsmen storm through the tunnels, executing the gas mask wearing Japanese soldier as the rest of the group flees. They are ambushed again by the mutated former POWs—who are now allied with the Imperial Guards—, and although they manage to kill several Su-Ling abandons them, dragging Price through a doorway and locking it behind her.

Captain Prawa is killed after making a heroic last stand in order to allow Rei and Stanley to escape. Su-Ling drags Warren all the way to the edge of the cave, but he has been driven insane by the formula and promptly kills her. Rei and Stanley flee the mine via an underwater tunnel system, but the Imperial Guardsmen are in hot pursuit; only Rei manages to escape from the tunnels. An exhausted Rei attempts to defend herself as more and more Guardsmen emerge from the lake, but it’s no use; the film ends as a Guardsman swings his sword at Rei’s midsection, presumably killing her.

Cast
 Ario Bayu as Captain Tino Prawa, Team of Five Captain
 Sam Hazeldine as Stanley
 Joe Taslim as Djoko
 Jaitov Tigor as Sergeant Papa Snake
 Mike Lewis as Ario
 Miki Mizuno as Rie
 Les Loveday as Warren Prince
 Carmen Soo as Su-Ling
 Jimmy Taenaka as Ryuichi

Home media
The film was released on DVD on May 28, 2013.

References

External links
 

2012 horror films
Indonesian horror films
Indonesian action horror films
English-language Indonesian films
2012 films
2010s English-language films
Films set in bunkers